Geronimo is an unincorporated community and census-designated place (CDP) in Guadalupe County, Texas, United States. The population was 1,032 at the 2010 census, up from 619 at the 2000 census. It is part of the San Antonio Metropolitan Statistical Area.

History
In 1831 during the Mexican Texas period, James Bowie surveyed eleven leagues of land within the colony of Green DeWitt. Located on the northeast bank of the Guadalupe River, the area surrounded the natural springs called "Tio Geronimo". José Antonio Navarro purchased land and lived here later, 1840–1853. As a champion of human rights, he was a signer of the Texas Declaration of Independence, the Constitution of the Republic of Texas, and the Constitution of the State of Texas.

Navarro lived here on his  San Geronimo Ranch. It was located on Geronimo Creek and named for Saint Jerome (translator of the Bible into Latin). The town and creek are named to honor this saint, although others claim that the name comes from original owner of the springs, "Tio" (Uncle) Geronimo Flores. José Antonio Navarro's brother, Luciano Navarro, also ran a ranch in the area.

In the mid-1800s, Geronimo became popular as a social center for German settlers. German settlers from Schumansville moved into the area in 1860 and formed a community. One enterprising settler opened a bank and German civic center. The community had grown into a small town by 1891, sporting a general store, a post office (former bank), a steam-powered cotton gin, and a population of twenty. A one-teacher school brought education to forty students in 1904. By 1917, the post office had relocated, sharing occupancy with a local feed store. In 1919, a park, complete with a spring-fed swimming pool, was constructed beside Geronimo Creek. After World War II, Geronimo hosted two gins and 123 residents.

Geography
Geronimo is located in northern Guadalupe County at  (29.665506, -97.965544), along Texas State Highway 123, which leads north  to San Marcos and south  to Seguin, the Guadalupe County seat.

Demographics
As of the census of 2000, there were 619 people, 194 households, and 157 families residing in the CDP. The population density was 67.5 people per square mile (26.1/km2). There were 209 housing units at an average density of 22.8/sq mi (8.8/km2). The racial makeup of the CDP was 72.21% White, 4.20% African American, 20.84% from other races, and 2.75% from two or more races. Hispanic or Latino of any race were 42.16% of the population.

There were 194 households, out of which 49.5% had children under the age of 18 living with them, 62.9% were married couples living together, 12.4% had a female householder with no husband present, and 18.6% were non-families. 13.9% of all households were made up of individuals, and 4.6% had someone living alone who was 65 years of age or older. The average household size was 3.19 and the average family size was 3.56.

In the CDP, the population was spread out, with 36.2% under the age of 18, 5.5% from 18 to 24, 31.2% from 25 to 44, 17.8% from 45 to 64, and 9.4% who were 65 years of age or older. The median age was 33 years. For every 100 females, there were 97.8 males. For every 100 females age 18 and over, there were 92.7 males.

The median income for a household in the CDP was $46,761, and the median income for a family was $47,273. Males had a median income of $36,806 versus $23,750 for females. The per capita income for the CDP was $17,569. None of the families and 1.5% of the population were living below the poverty line, including no under eighteens and none of those over 64.

Education
Geronimo is served by the Navarro Independent School District.

Attractions
Geronimo has turned into a day-trip destination for travelers from the Hill Country, Austin, San Antonio and the Valley. Geronimo is home to five antique shops: Blue Hills Antique Mall, Elsie's Attic, Geronimo Antiques, and two other locations inside the town. Geronimo is famed for its annual BBQ & Chili Cook-Offs and VFW raffle and auction. The local VFW Post 8456 (located in the previous general store) holds country and western dances almost every Sunday afternoon in Texas Hill Country dance hall tradition.

References

  Bading, Martha Carolyn Heinemeyer, The History of Geronimo, Guadalupe County, Texas 78115, Jan. 2007, Atwood Printing and Trophy Co.,

External links
Geronimo Memorial VFW Post 8456

Census-designated places in Guadalupe County, Texas
Census-designated places in Texas
Unincorporated communities in Guadalupe County, Texas
Unincorporated communities in Texas
Greater San Antonio